Tendayi David Darikwa (born 13 December 1991) is a professional footballer who plays as a right back for EFL Championship club Wigan Athletic. Born in England, he plays international football for Zimbabwe.

Early life
Born to Zimbabwean expatriate parents in Nottingham, Darikwa was raised in neighbouring West Bridgford and attended Abbey Road Primary School.

Club career

Chesterfield
Darikwa started his career at Chesterfield, signing his first professional contract in the summer of 2010, before joining Barrow on loan with fellow Chesterfield player Craig Clay in October 2010.

He made his debut for Chesterfield on 27 November 2010, replacing Dean Smalley in the 55th minute of Chesterfield's 3–1 FA Cup defeat at Burton Albion.

Darikwa made his league debut for Chesterfield in the 2011–12 season when he started away to hometown club Notts County. He was offered a new one-year contract by the club in May 2012.

Due to good league performances early in 2012–13 season, after the appointment of new manager Paul Cook in late October 2012, Darikwa signed a one-year contract extension until 2015. He then received national recognition by winning the Football League Young Player of the Month for December 2012 In October 2013, Darikwa was linked with a move to Premier League club Manchester United, with manager David Moyes scouting the player. Darikwa said he was "flattered" by the interest, but felt he was "not ready" to play at that level.

On 30 March 2014, he played at Wembley Stadium in Chesterfield's 3–1 defeat to Peterborough United in the final of the Football League Trophy. He also played a vital role in helping the club get promoted when they won the League Two title at the end of the 2013–14 season.

After being converted from a right winger to a right back during the 2013–14 season, for the 2014–15 season Darikwa's squad number was changed from 7 to 2 to reflect his positional change. On 7 April 2015, he scored his first goal of the 2014–15 season with a headed goal in a victory against Crewe Alexandra. After another impressive season in his converted right back position, Darikwa helped Chesterfield reach the League One play-offs in 2014–15; however, they were beaten over two legs in the semi-final against Preston North End.

On 6 May 2015, Darikwa won four awards at the Chesterfield end of season awards, where he won the Player of the Year Award and Players' Player of the Season Award.

Burnley
Darikwa signed a three-year-contract with Championship club Burnley on 30 July 2015. On 8 August 2015, the opening day of the 2015–16 season, he made his debut for Burnley against Leeds United in a 1–1 draw, getting the assist for Sam Vokes' equaliser. On 26 September, he scored his first goal for Burnley in a 2–1 loss to Reading.

Nottingham Forest
Darikwa signed a four-year contract with Nottingham Forest on 26 July 2017. He made his league debut for the club on 4 August 2017 in a 1–0 home win over Millwall. He scored his first goal for the club in an EFL Cup tie against Chelsea on 20 September 2017.

Wigan Athletic
On 11 January 2021, Darikwa joined League One side Wigan Athletic on a short-term contract until the end of the season, making his debut for the club on 16 January in a 3–3 draw with Rochdale. Darikwa signed a two-year contract with the club on 1 July 2021. He scored his first goal for Wigan in a 2–0 win at Charlton Athletic on 21 August 2021.

International career
In October 2013, Darikwa revealed he was keen to play for the Zimbabwe national team, but reconsidered his position after being asked to pay a "processing fee" by a former Zimbabwe Football Association official. He did reveal he would consider any future approach from Zimbabwe or England. Darikwa made his debut for Zimbabwe on 8 November 2017 in a friendly defeat to Lesotho.

Career statistics

Club

International

Honours
Chesterfield
Football League Two: 2013–14
Football League Trophy runner-up: 2013–14
Zimbabwe
COSAFA Cup bronze: 2019

Wigan league 1 2021/22

Individual
Football League Young Player of the Month: December 2012
Chesterfield Player of the Year: 2014–15
Chesterfield Players' Player of the Season: 2014–15

References

External links

Profile on the Nottingham Forest F.C. website

1991 births
Living people
Footballers from Nottingham
English footballers
Zimbabwean footballers
Zimbabwe international footballers
Association football defenders
Association football midfielders
Chesterfield F.C. players
Barrow A.F.C. players
Hinckley United F.C. players
Burnley F.C. players
Nottingham Forest F.C. players
Wigan Athletic F.C. players
National League (English football) players
English Football League players
2019 Africa Cup of Nations players
Black British sportspeople
English people of Zimbabwean descent